Hengroen was a stallion owned by King Arthur, according to the Welsh tale Culhwch and Olwen.

See also
Llamrei
List of fictional horses

References

Horses in mythology
Welsh mythology
Arthurian characters